Grapevine Bulgarian latent virus (GBLV) is a plant pathogenic virus of the family Secoviridae.

External links
ICTVdB—The Universal Virus Database: Grapevine Bulgarian latent virus
Family Groups—The Baltimore Method

Nepoviruses
Viral grape diseases